Kavya Madhavan (born 19 September 1984) is a former Indian actress, who appeared predominantly in Malayalam films. She made her debut in 1991 as a child artist in Pookkalam Varavayi. Her debut role as a lead actress was in Lal Jose's Chandranudikkunna Dikhil in 1999, when she was in the ninth grade. Its success established her status as a leading actress in the industry during the 2000s. She has acted in over 75 movies. She has won the Kerala State Film Award for Best Actress twice, for her performances in Perumazhakkalam (2004) and Gaddama (2010).

Early life
Kavya was born on 19 September 1984 in Kerala.

Acting career
Kavya first appeared as a child actor in Kamal's film Pookkalam Varavayi (1991) at the age of six. Subsequently, she was offered parts in other projects such as Pavam IA Ivachan (1994), Parassala Pachan Payyannur Paramu (1994) by P. Venu and Azhakiya Ravanan (1996), directed by Kamal. She was offered the female lead in Chandranudikkunna Dikhil, also starring Dileep, in 1999. After the success of Chandranudikkunna Dikhil, Kavya and Dileep became a popular pairing in Malayalam cinema, and they worked together in 21 movies. Some of their movies are Thenkasipattanam (2000), Darling Darling (2000), Dhosth (2001), Meesa Madhavan (2002) which was one of biggest grosser of the year and was directed by Lal Jose, Mizhi Randilum (2003) in which she played a double role, Sadanandante Samayam (2003), Thilakkam (2003) directed by Jayaraj, Runway (2004) directed by Joshiy, Kochi Rajavu (2005), Lion (2006) again directed by Joshiy, Chakkara Muthu (2006), Inspector Garud (2007), Paappi Appacha (2010), Vellaripravinte Changathi (2011) and Pinneyum (2016). Most of their movies were in the romantic comedy genre.

She also acted in films with Mammootty and Mohanlal, and in movies with several stars, such as Ee Pattanathil Bhootham, Christian Brothers and China Town.

She got critical acclaim for her performance of the role of Ganga in Perumazhakkalam for which she won 2004 Kerala State Film Award for Best Actress and for the role of Ashwati in Gaddama where she played a housemaid working in Saudi Arabia. The movie was based on a feature by K. U. Iqbal, published in Bhashaposhini. The movie was directed by her mentor Kamal, and she got her second Kerala State Film Award for Best Actress for 2011. She won the 2011 Kerala Film Critics Awards for Best Actress, Amrita-FEFKA Film Awards for Best Actress, Best Actress-Malayalam cinema in 59th Filmfare Awards South and Best Actress in Thikkurissy Foundation Awards. She was part of big grossers like Christian Brothers and China Town in 2011 and was selected as Top Star (Female) 2011 in Malayalam.

She was cast in Adoor Gopalakrishnan's Naalu Pennungal in which she played a supporting role.

Though she had many offers from Tamil cinema, she was very reluctant to act due to her busy schedule in Malayalam. Her first was Kasi (2001) which was the remake of Vinayans Vasanthiyum Lakshmiyum Pinne Njaanum. She went on to act in En Mana Vaanil and Sadhu Miranda and enjoyed moderate success.

She wrote lyrics for the song "En Khalbillulloru Pennaanu" for the film One Way Ticket (2008) and for Akashavani (2016). She sang her first movie song for the Malayalam film Matinee (2012). She has appeared in many advertisements, TV shows, short films and stage shows. She also sang songs for the movies Hadiya (2017) and  Daivame Kaithozham K. Kumar Akanam (2018).

From acting as a child to acting as an actress, Sreeja has provided voice to her in many films. Devi, Praveena, Bhagyalakshmi and Vimmy Mariam George and Nithuna Nevil Dinesh have also lent their voices in some films.

Personal life
Kavya married Nishal Chandra on 9 February 2009, after which she moved to Kuwait. However, she returned home in June the same year and filed for divorce on 24 July 2009. Both Kavya and Nishal appeared before the court on 25 May 2011 and expressed their willingness for a mutual divorce. The divorce was granted on 30 May 2011. She married actor Dileep on 25 November 2016 at Vedanta Hotel, Kochi. The couple have a daughter, Mahalakshmi born on 19 October 2018.

Kavya owns a textile shop named Laksyah. In April 2013, Mathrubhumi Books published a collection of memoirs written by Kavya, titled Kathayil Alpam Kavyam which gives a glimpse into her childhood memories and the experiences of her school days and in the film industry. The book was released by writers Subhash Chandran and Deedi Damodaran at a function held in K. P. Kesava Menon Hall in Kozhikode on 11 April.

Filmography

Short films

Awards and nominations

References

External links

 

Kerala State Film Award winners
Living people
Indian film actresses
Actresses in Malayalam cinema
Actresses in Tamil cinema
Actresses from Kerala
20th-century Indian actresses
21st-century Indian actresses
People from Kasaragod district
Filmfare Awards South winners
Indian women playback singers
21st-century Indian singers
21st-century Indian women singers
Singers from Kerala
Film musicians from Kerala
20th-century Indian women singers
20th-century Indian singers
1984 births
Women musicians from Kerala